Didier de Radiguès (born 27 March 1958) is a Belgian former professional motorcycle racer, auto racing driver and current artist. He also serves as a television sports color commentator for Belgium television, a Moto GP riders manager and as the owner of a motorcycle riding school. He competed in the FIM motorcycle Grand Prix world championships from 1980 to 1991.

Motorsport career 

Born in Leuven, De Radiguès, made his motorcycle Grand Prix debut in 1979, racing in the 500cc class. His best year was in 1982 when he won two races and finished second to Anton Mang in the 350cc world championship. He rode in 500cc for the Yamaha factory racing team in 1988 as a team-mate to Eddie Lawson and ended his career with the Suzuki team in 1991 as Kevin Schwantz' team-mate. He won four Grands Prix during his career as well as the 1991 Macau Grand Prix, a non-championship event.

De Radiguès is the Belgium's most successful motorcycle road racer with four Grand Prix victories. In 1992 at the request of the riders, de Radiguès organized the International Motorcycle Riders Association which was then managed by Franco Uncini at IRTA.

After his motorcycle racing career, de Radiguès took up sports car endurance racing, winning the 1997 Belgian Procar Championship as well as the Spa 24 Hours race and the championship in the American Le Mans Series in 2001. In 1998 de Radiguès entered the 24 Hours of Le Mans with fellow ex-motorcycle rider Wayne Gardner.

In 2003, de Radiguès began a motorcycle riding school in France.

Television career 

De Radiguès is also a Motorsport TV consultant, first on Club RTL and then on RTBF (since 2013), the two largest French-speaking Belgian TV channels. He gives commentary on Moto2 and Moto GP races.

Artistic career 

Didier de Radiguès started his artistic career in New York and Singapore, Brussels, Hong Kong and Paris. His first series called « From My Gazebo » is inspired by his many trips to the Bahamas. From his gazebo, planted in the heart of the Atlantic Ocean on a small island of the Exumas, Didier de Radiguès captures the landscape around him. His latest series is called People Portrait.

Motorcycle Grand Prix results
Points system from 1969 to 1987:

Points system from 1988 to 1992:

(key) (Races in bold indicate pole position; races in italics indicate fastest lap)

Source:

24 Hours of Le Mans results

References

External links 
 Didier de Radiguès motorcycle school
  Didier de Radiguès Artist Photographer 

1958 births
Living people
Sportspeople from Leuven
Belgian motorcycle racers
Belgian racing drivers
250cc World Championship riders
350cc World Championship riders
500cc World Championship riders
24 Hours of Le Mans drivers
FIA GT Championship drivers
American Le Mans Series drivers
24 Hours of Spa drivers
Motorsport announcers
24 Hours of Daytona drivers
Multimatic Motorsports drivers